Pililaelaps is a genus of mites in the family Laelapidae.

Species
 Pililaelaps longiseta (Banks, 1909)

References

Laelapidae